Kasusu is a neighborhood in the city of Fort Portal, the largest urban center in Kabarole District, in the Western Region of Uganda.

Location
The geographical coordinates of Kasusu are:0°37'26.0"N, 30°15'25.0"E (Latitude:0.623889; Longitude:30.256944).

Overview
Kasusu is a mixed residential and commercial neighborhood, with emphasis on the commercial side. The area has attracted new developers in the decade between 2010 and 2020. They have constructed new commercial structures, including schools, retail shops, bars, hotels and motels.

Kasusu is considered attractive because of the availability of land for future development, the relatively low population density, compared t other parts of the city, and the low noise levels in the neighborhood.

With Fort Portal destined to become a city in July 2020, the attractiveness of Kasusu is expected to increase as old and new residents' demand for services is expected to increase.

Points of interest
These are some of the points of interest in or near Kasusu:

Virika Hospital, with about 160 beds, lies about halfway between downtown and Kasusu. So is Virika School of Nursing, situated adjacent to the hospital. Uganda Pentecostal University and Uganda Martyrs University maintain campuses further north, but have many employees who reside in Kasusu. Many places of worship, including Virika Roman Catholic Cathedral, Kidukuru Church of Uganda, Kasusu Roman Catholic Church, Rubingo Church of Uganda and others are within walking distance from Kasusu.

Karuzika Palace, the official residence of the King of Toro, one of Uganda's constitutional monarchs, is about three quarters of the way to downtown, west of the Fort Portal–Kasese–Mpondwe Road.

See also
 Fort Portal Regional Referral Hospital
 Mountains of the Moon University
 Nyakasura School

References

External links
 Seven Day Weather Forecast for Kasusu

Fort Portal
Populated places in Western Region, Uganda
Cities in the Great Rift Valley
Kabarole District